Osby is a locality and the seat of Osby Municipality, Scania County, Sweden with 7,157 inhabitants in 2010.

Swedish ice hockey goaltender Magnus Åkerlund was born in Osby.

The toy manufacturer BRIO was based in Osby, but moved to Malmö in 2006. The company's toy museum, the BRIO Lekoseum, remains in Osby.

Climate 
Osby has an oceanic climate that retains a four-season characteristic. It has resemblances of moderate continental, with summers sometimes being very warm and winter lows dropping below freezing with regularity for a few months. Its southerly inland position has rendered it to be one of the few locations in the country that has reached  in May. In spite of this summer averages are not exceptional when compared with adjacent coastal areas.

See also
Romero Osby (born 1990), American basketball player for Maccabi Kiryat Gat of the Israeli Basketball Premier League

References

External links
Osby.se - Official website for Osby municipality

Populated places in Skåne County
Populated places in Osby Municipality
Municipal seats of Skåne County
Swedish municipal seats